Finding Prince Charming is an American reality-TV dating show that premiered on the cable network Logo on September 8, 2016. It is hosted by actor and pop singer Lance Bass. Robert Sepúlveda Jr., an interior designer based in Atlanta, was cast as a suitor for the first season.

The concept of the show was modeled after The Bachelor, but instead of having a rose ceremony, it features a black tie ceremony. This is also the first dating show featuring homosexual male contestants since Bravo's Boy Meets Boy and Fox's Playing It Straight.

Format
A cast of thirteen gay suitors will live together in one house with a Prince Charming in the search for love. Each week the Prince Charming will go on group or solo dates with different men. At the end of the episode, Prince Charming will have to eliminate contestants in a "black tie" ceremony, where black ties will be given to the guys he wants to keep and get to know more, while the guys who do not get a black tie will be eliminated. At the end of the process, Prince Charming will choose one man to try a relationship with outside of the series.

Production
The American cable network Logo ordered production of Finding Prince Charming on July 12, 2016, and announced that Lance Bass would host of the series. Shortly after the announcement, reports of the alleged suitor began and filming began in July 2016. Brian Graden, Dave Mace, Fred Birckhead, Nick Murray, Chris McCarthy, Pamela Post and Stevenson Greene are recognized as the series' executive producers; it is produced and distributed by Brian Graden Media.

On October 13, 2016, the series was renewed for a second installment. Applications for season two became available on November 3, 2016, and closed on November 16, 2016. Five suitors would be submitted to public voting and the winning suitor would be featured on season two as a contestant. Voting was from November 18 to November 23, 2016. However, as of 2023, a second installment has yet to be aired.

Contestants
The cast consists of 13 eligible men from the ages of 26–35.

Contestants' ages are at the time of filming.

Contestant Progress

 The contestant received the first black tie or was called first to keep his black tie.
 The contestant received the last black tie or was the last one called to keep his black tie.
 The contestant quit the competition.
 The contestant was eliminated.
 The contestant was the runner up.
 The contestant won Finding Prince Charming.

Controversy
A week before the premiere, an industry trade report revealed that series suitor Robert Sepulveda Jr. had previously engaged in prostitution and escort work. The following week he discussed he started turning to paid sexual encounters beginning in his 20s, and also spoke about a pornographic video released by what he characterized as a disgruntled ex-boyfriend. Logo said it was not aware of Sepulveda's history until after production had started. Contestant Chad Aaron Spodick claimed he had been fired from his job following the controversy.

Episodes

International versions
 A current production
 No longer airing

References

External links
 
 
 

2016 American television series debuts
2010s American reality television series
American dating and relationship reality television series
American LGBT-related reality television series
English-language television shows
Logo TV original programming
2010s LGBT-related reality television series
2016 American television series endings